Staffing models are related sets of reports, charts and graphs that are used to precisely measure work activity, determine how many labor hours are needed,  analyze how employee time is spent and calculate costs. Staffing models are used in the healthcare industry and use predictive analytics methods for forecasting.

Overview
Staffing models provide:
 A structure for staff scheduling
 Staff interactions
 Both a broad and in-depth picture of work activity, and its time and cost
 Information about current resource and process performance
 Information and tools to manage and improve staffing resource performance.

Staffing models are also used to reduce overtime costs.

Time presentation curves have been used to guide staffing in the emergency department.

See also

 Job analysis
 Salary inversion
 Task analysis
 Work sampling

References

Further reading
 
  
 
  
 Personalvermittlung (in German)

Human resource management
Management systems